Clepticodes is a genus of moths belonging to the family Tineidae.

Species
Clepticodes horocentra Meyrick, 1927
Clepticodes hexaleuca Meyrick, 1932

C. clasmaticus is actually Catalectis pharetropa.

References

Tineidae
Tineidae genera
Taxa named by Edward Meyrick